The Roof of the World or Top of the World is a metaphoric epithet or phrase used to describe the high region in the world, also known as High Asia. The term usually refers to the mountainous interior of Asia, including the Pamirs, the Himalayas, the Tibetan Plateau, the Tian Shan, and the Altai Mountains.

Attested usage 
The British explorer John Wood, writing in 1838, described Bam-i-Duniah (Roof of the World) as a "native expression" (presumably Wakhi), and it was generally used for the Pamirs in Victorian times: In 1876, another British traveler, Sir Thomas Edward Gordon, employed it as the title of a book and wrote in Chapter IX:
  "We were now about to cross the famous 'Bam-i-Dunya', 'The Roof of the World' under which name the elevated region of the hitherto comparatively unknown Pamir tracts had long appeared in our maps.[...] Wood, in 1838, was the first European traveler of modern times to visit the Great Pamir,". 
Older encyclopedias also used "Roof of the World"  to describe the Pamirs:
Encyclopædia Britannica, 11th ed. (1911): "PAMIRS, a mountainous region of central Asia...the Bam-i-Dunya ('The Roof of the World')".
The Columbia Encyclopedia, 1942 edition: "the Pamirs (Persian = roof of the world)".
 Hachette, 1890: "Le Toit du monde (Pamir)", French for "Roof of the World (Pamir)".
 Der Große Brockhaus, Leipzig 1928-1935: "Dach der Welt, Bezeichnung für das Hochland von Pamir", i.e., "roof of the world, term describing the Pamir highlands", and (in translation): "Pamir highlands, the nodal point of the mountain systems of Tien-Shan, Kun-lun, Karakoram, the Himalayas and Hindukush, and therefore called the roof of the world."

With the awakening of public interest in Tibet, the Pamirs, "since 1875 ... probably the best explored region in High Asia", went out of the limelight and the description "Roof of the World" has been increasingly applied to Tibet and the Tibetan plateau, and occasionally, esp. in French ("Toit du monde"), even to Mt. Everest, but the traditional use is still alive.

Recently, in a 2020 study the term High Asia was used metaphorically to categorise Kashmir, Hazara, Nuristan, Laghman, Azad Kashmir, Jammu, Himachal Pradesh, Ladakh, Gilgit Baltistan, Chitral, Western Tibet, Western Xinjiang, Badakhshan, Gorno Badakhshan, Fergana, Osh and Turkistan Region. These rich resource areas are surrounded by the five major mountainous systems of Tien Shan, Pamirs, Karakoram, Hindu Kush and Western Himalayas and the three main river systems of Amu Darya, Syr Darya and Indus. The work further highlighted the role of the United States, China, Russia, United Kingdom, India, Pakistan, Afghanistan, Kazakhstan, Uzbekistan, Kyrgyzstan, Tajikistan, Turkey, Iran and other players involved in The New Great Game over who will dominate High Asia in the 21st century. The work also tries to explore Pan-High Asianism and High Asian Approaches to International Law (HAAIL) as the potential way forward for the region which was sub-categorised into the Western Pahari, Greater Dardic, Trans-Himalayan, Badakhshan and Sogdiana cultural belts.

See also
Four continents
Seven Seas
Mount Imeon

References 

Metaphors
Mountains of Asia